The Popular Movement for the Development of the Republic of West Africa (PMD) was a political party in Mali.

History
The party received 2.7% of the vote in the 1992 parliamentary elections, winning six seats.

The party boycotted the July 1997 parliamentary elections after the annulment of the April elections.

References

Defunct political parties in Mali